Dana Kurdish is the former Consul General of Israel in Bangalore with consular jurisdiction over Karnataka, Tamil Nadu, Kerala and Puducherry.  She served from August 2017 until 2020. She had previously served from June 2015 to July 2017 as Deputy Ambassador of Israel to India in New Delhi.

Kursh was born and raised in Moshav Merhavia. Kursh's grandmother was murdered in the Holocaust. (One account says her grandmother had a lifelong scar on a forehead after a bullet meant to kill her missed.) She earned a BA in International Relations from Hebrew University of Jerusalem and an MA in Public Policy (the Executive program of the Hebrew University of Jerusalem).

References

Israeli consuls
Israeli women diplomats
Hebrew University of Jerusalem Faculty of Social Sciences alumni
Living people
Year of birth missing (living people)